The Theban Tomb TT38 is located in Sheikh Abd el-Qurna, part of the Theban Necropolis, on the west bank of the Nile, opposite to Luxor. It is the burial place of the ancient Egyptian official Djeserkaraseneb (who was Scribe and Counter of the Grain in the Granary of Amun during the reign of Thutmose IV) and his family.

See also
 List of Theban tombs
 N. de Garis Davies, Nina and Norman de Garis Davies, Egyptologists

References

External links
 Scans of Norman and Nina De Garis Davies' tracings from Theban Tomb 38 (external).

Theban tombs